Challwa Mayu  (Quechua challwa fish, mayu river, "fish river", hispaniciced spelling Challhua Mayu) is a Bolivian village in the south-east of the Cochabamba Department located in the Arani Province, Vacas Municipality, north-west of Vacas. At the time of census 2001 it had 770 inhabitants.

The Ismael Montes Teacher Training College is situated in Challwa Mayu.

Gallery

See also 
 Asiru Qucha
 Parqu Qucha
 Qullpa Qucha

References 

Populated places in Cochabamba Department